Kate Drumgoold (born c. 1858 or 1859 – ?) was an American woman born into slavery around 1858 near Petersburg, Virginia.  Her life is captured in her 1898 autobiography, A Slave Girl's Story, Being an Autobiography of Kate Drumgoold. It offers a message of racial uplift, faith, and education. "It is a rare portrait of a former slave who moved between the highly urbanized environment of New York City and the rural South."

References

Further reading
Andrews, William L., ed. Six Women's Slave Narratives (1988).
DePriest, Tomika. "Drumgoold, Kate", Black Women in America: An Historical Encyclopedia, ed. Darlene Clark Hine. Brooklyn, New York: Carlson Publishing, 1993, 356–357.
Drumgoold, Kate. [http://docsouth.unc.edu/neh/drumgoold/menu.html A Slave Girl's Story. Being an Autobiography of Kate Drumgoold]. Brooklyn: The Author, 1898.
Fleischner, Jennifer. Mastering Slavery: Memory, Family, and Identity in Women's Slave Narratives, New York: New York University Press, 1996
Gwin, Minrose C. "Drumgoold, Kate," The Oxford Companion to African American Literature, New York: Oxford University Press, 1997, p. 237. 
Jones, Sharon L. "Mastering Slavery: Memory, Family and Identity in Women’s Slave Narratives". MELUS (2000): 307 in Context.
Malburne, Meredith. "Summary of A Slave Girl's Story. Being an Autobiography of Kate Drumgoold". Documenting the American South. University of North Carolina at Chapel Hill.

External links
 

1850s births
19th-century American slaves
Year of death missing
People who wrote slave narratives
People from Dinwiddie County, Virginia
19th-century American women writers
19th-century African-American writers
19th-century African-American women writers